The Egypt women's national under-20 volleyball team, represents Egypt in international volleyball competitions and friendly matches.

Results

FIVB U20 World Championship
 Champions   Runners up   Third place   Fourth place

African U20 Championship

Team

Current squad

The following is the Egyptian roster in the 2015 FIVB Volleyball Women's U20 World Championship.

Head Coach: Ahmed Fathi

References

External links
www.evbf.org 

Volleyball
National women's under-20 volleyball teams
Volleyball in Egypt
Women's sport in Egypt